{{DISPLAYTITLE:C22H28NO3}}

The molecular formula C22H28NO3 (C22H28NO3+, molar mass: 354.46 g/mol) may refer to:
 Benzilone, an antimuscarinic
 Bevonium, an antimuscarinic
 Pipenzolate